Dean Thomas is an English Rugby league football coach and former player. He is the coach of the Leicester Storm in the Conference League South.

Player 
Thomas played for Ryedale-York and Barrow Raiders. His primary position was winger. While at Ryedale-York he coached the York u16's in the English schools Rugby League after gaining his level 2 coaching badge.

Coaching 
After retiring from playing in 2001 Thomas joined Sheffield Eagles rugby league club as fitness conditioner staying in this role for 5 years. He left to join National League Two club Gateshead Thunder as head coach. During his two-season stay he took the club to the play-offs in both seasons. He left to go to Salford City Reds where he was a fitness conditioner. In 2008 he returned to Sheffield Eagles as Head of Youth Development and performance coach. Thomas was appointed head coach of Leicester Storm in 2013

International 
Dean was appointed coach for the West Indies in 2004. In 2009 he was appointed head coach of Jamaica where he coached them in the Atlantic cup, and the qualifiers for the 2013 Rugby League World Cup

References

External links 

 Leicester Storm website

1966 births
Living people
Barrow Raiders players
English rugby league players
English rugby league coaches
Jamaica national rugby league team coaches
Leicester Storm coaches
Newcastle Thunder coaches
Rugby league players from Staffordshire
Rugby league wingers
West Indies national rugby league team coaches
York Wasps players